Alıc (also, Alıç, Alich, and Alych) is a village in the Quba Rayon of Azerbaijan.  The village forms part of the municipality of Ərməki.

References

External links

Populated places in Quba District (Azerbaijan)